Chelmsford is a town in Massachusetts, United States. The Chelmsford militia played a role in the American Revolution at the Battle of Lexington and Concord and the Battle of Bunker Hill.  

Chelmsford was incorporated in May 1655 by an act of the Massachusetts General Court.  When Chelmsford was incorporated, its local economy was fueled by lumber mills, limestone quarries and kilns. The farming community of East Chelmsford was incorporated as Lowell in the 1820s; over the next decades it would go on to become one of the first large-scale factory towns in the United States because of its early role in the country's Industrial Revolution. Chelmsford experienced a drastic increase in population between 1950 and 1970, coinciding with the connection of U.S. Route 3 in Lowell to Massachusetts Route 128 in the 1950s and the extension of U.S. Route 3 from Chelmsford to New Hampshire in the 1960s.

Chelmsford has a representative town meeting form of government. The current town manager is Paul Cohen. The town has one public high school—Chelmsford High School, which is ranked among the top 500 schools in the nation—as well as two middle schools, and four elementary schools. The charter middle school started in Chelmsford became a regional charter school (Innovation Academy Charter School) covering grades 5 through 12, now located in Tyngsborough.  Chelmsford high school age students also have the option of attending the Nashoba Valley Technical High School, located in Westford.  In 2011, Chelmsford was declared the 28th best place to live in the United States by Money magazine.

History

Early colonization 

The Pennacook inhabited the area for thousands of years prior to European colonization. Settler-colonizers from the adjacent communities of Woburn and Concord founded Chelmsford in 1652. An act of the Massachusetts General Court in the last week of May 1655 incorporated Chelmsford as a town; it was named after Chelmsford, England. The nearby communities of Groton and Billerica were incorporated at the same time. Chelmsford originally contained the neighboring town of Westford, as well as parts of Carlisle, Tyngsborough and a large part of Lowell (formerly known as East Chelmsford). 

Successive Pennacook leaders Passaconaway and Wonalancet strove to maintain a friendship with the European settler-colonizers who founded Chelmsford within their territory. Despite this determinedly pro-peace stance, Chelmsford settlers became increasingly violent towards the tribe, often forcing the Pennacook to flee north temporarily or permanently. On one notable occasion, a handful of Pennacook who were too sick or elderly to flee with their kin remained behind and Chelmsford settlers burnt them alive in their dwelling. Eventually most Pennacook refugees permanently moved north to join relations in Odanak, but their descendants among the Abenaki First Nation and other tribes of the Wabanaki Confederacy continue to view Chelmsford as part of their ancestral and unceded homeland.

In 1722 Chelmsford had imposed a fine for keeping strangers in town for more than 30 days. This was used for racial, religious, and political discrimination, as well as to keep out witchcraft. This practice and similar ones occurred until the Act of Settlement of 1793. 

In 1760, several women of Chelmsford were suspected of being witches such as Sarah (Hildreth) Byam and Martha Sparks who were charged under these accusations. Martha was held in the Boston Gaol for witchcraft, appeared in court, but was eventually set free after about a month. Some relate her freedom to the influence of the Chelmsford minister. 

The Chelmsford militia played a role in the American Revolution at the Battle of Lexington and Concord and the Battle of Bunker Hill.  The town's own Lieutenant Colonel Moses Parker fought on the hill.  He was wounded and captured, and died from his wounds on July 4, 1775.  The Lieutenant Colonel Moses Parker Middle School honors his name, and the lobby displays a representation of the man. He is depicted in the John Trumbull painting The Death of General Warren at the Battle of Bunker's Hill, June 17, 1775 and in a painting in the Bunker Hill Museum. Captain Benjamin Walker of this town was also killed in this battle.

Later history 

Ralph Waldo Emerson opened a school in Chelmsford in 1825, closing it after a few months to take over his brother's school in Roxbury.

Chelmsford's first school for the deaf was established in 1866, with a focus in oralism. There was a maximum capacity of eight students at a time. This pioneer school was eventually closed in order to make way for the formation of a larger deaf school in Rowley known as Clark School.

Both the Middlesex Canal and Middlesex Turnpike, major transportation routes, were built through Chelmsford in the first part of the 19th century.

Chelmsford was the birthplace of the Chelmsford Spring Co. in 1901, which later became the Chelmsford Ginger Ale Company, acquired by Canada Dry in 1928. The ginger ale plant, rebuilt in 1912 after a disastrous fire consumed the original plant, stood on Route 110 until its demolition in 1994. The Chelmsford brand of golden ginger ale continued to be manufactured by Canada Dry for decades. It is currently manufactured by Polar Beverages for DeMoulas/Market Basket supermarkets, based out of neighboring Tewksbury.

Geography

Chelmsford is bordered by two sizable rivers: the Merrimack River to the north, and the Concord River to the east.

Chelmsford consists of several neighborhoods.  In addition to the town center, smaller areas include South Chelmsford, West Chelmsford, East Chelmsford, North Chelmsford and The Westlands. North Chelmsford, an industrial village, is distinct from the rest of the town to the extent that it has many of its own town services.  

Like much of the rest of Massachusetts, Chelmsford has a humid continental climate according to the Köppen climate classification.  Summers are typically warm and humid, while winters tend to be cold, windy, and snowy.  The level of precipitation is roughly consistent throughout the year.

Demographics

As of the US census of 2010, there were 33,802 people, 13,313 households, and 9,328 families residing in the town. The racial makeup of the town was 88.6% White, 1.1% African American, 0.1% Native American, 8.4% Asian, 0.4% from other races, and 1.4% from two or more races. Hispanic or Latino of any race were 2% of the population.

Crime

As of 2008, Chelmsford had a violent crime rate of 132 incidents per 100,000 people, compared to a rate of 449 in Massachusetts as a whole and 455 nationwide.  The town had a property crime rate of 1,904 incidents per 100,000 people in 2008, compared to a rate of 2,400 for the state and 3,213 nationwide.  Chelmsford has one police station located near McCarthy Middle School.  The , $7.19-million dollar structure began operation in 2003.

Government

The town uses a representative town meeting model with a Board of Selectmen overseeing the operation of the town. As of May 2020, the members of the Board of Selectmen are: Chairman Virginia Crocker Timmins, Vice Chairman Kenneth Lefebvre, Clerk Mark Carota, George R. Dixon, Jr. and Pat Wojtas..  Reporting to the Board of Selectmen are the town manager, town counsel, and town accountant. The town manager oversees the public employees and serves as Chief Executive Officer.  The current town manager is Paul Cohen. Other elected boards include the Planning Board, School Committee, Library Trustees, Cemetery Commission, Board of Health, Sewer Commission and the Zoning Board of Appeals.

 Chelmsford is represented in the Massachusetts Senate by Michael J. Barrett.  The town sends four delegates to the Massachusetts House of Representatives, each of whom represent one or more of Chelmsford's nine precincts.  Tami Gouveia is the state representative for precincts one and nine; Thomas Golden Jr., precincts two, three, and eight; James Arciero, precincts eight, five and seven; and Vanna Howard, precinct four.

The Fay A. Rotenberg School, a juvenile correctional facility for girls operated by the Robert F. Kennedy Children's Action Corps, Inc. on behalf of the Massachusetts Department of Youth Services, first opened in North Chelmsford in 1982; this facility had 16 beds. In 2006 the school moved to its current location in Westborough.

Education

The Chelmsford Public Schools district serves students in pre-Kindergarten through twelfth grade. Data below are from Massachusetts Department of Elementary and Secondary Education (ESE); class sizes are for 2008–2009 school year.

All expenditures considered, the Chelmsford public schools district spent $10,070 per pupil as of 2008, which was lower than the state average of $12,449.  This was an increase of almost $400 from Chelmsford per-pupil spending in 2007.  As of 2008 per-pupil allocation, $3,937 went to classroom and specialist teachers, $333 to administration, and $185 to instructional materials, equipment and technology.

In 2009, Chelmsford High School ranked 66th out of 150 public high schools considered by Boston Magazine.  The ranking took into account many statistics associated with quality of education and academic performance, including the school's 14.5:1 student–teacher ratio.  In the 2006–2007 school year, the average SAT scores for Chelmsford High School were 527 in the reading section, 519 in writing, and 535 in math. Chelmsford High School performed significantly better than the state average in the English, math and science portions of the 2009 Grade 10 MCAS tests, scoring 89, 87 and 77 out of 100, respectively.

Historic places in Chelmsford

Chelmsford Center Historic District
Fiske House (1798)
Hildreth-Robbins House (1742)
Middlesex Canal (1802)
Old Chelmsford Garrison House (1691), now a museum
Oliver Hutchins House (1820)
Barrett-Byam Homestead (1663)-home of the Chelmsford Historical Society
North Town Hall (1853)

Transportation

Chelmsford is located at the intersection of the major US highways of I-495 and U.S. 3. Also found in Chelmsford are state routes 3A, 4, 27, 40, 110, and 129, making it a significant junction of roadways. The heart of the town center is Central Square - the junction of routes 4, 110, the end of 129, and Westford Street.

Chelmsford is home to the former Drum Hill Rotary. This rotary was the cause of many accidents that occurred due to its small overall size and ability for vehicles to gain speed. It formed the intersection of U.S. Route 3 (exit 32), Route 4, Drum Hill Road, and Westford Road. The rotary was demolished in 2003.  It was replaced with a four intersection square with traffic lights, and is now called Drum Hill Square.  This was part of a widening project for U.S. Route 3 between Interstate 95 (Route 128) and the New Hampshire state line.

Freight travels daily through Chelmsford over the tracks of the historic Stony Brook Railroad. The line currently serves as a major corridor of Pan Am Railways' District 3 which connects New Hampshire and Maine with western Massachusetts, Vermont, and New York.

The Bruce Freeman Rail Trail runs  through Chelmsford, including the Central Square intersection.

The LRTA bus routes 15, 16 and 17 connect Chelmsford to the Lowell train station on the MBTA Commuter Rail Lowell Line.

Notable people

 Josiah Gardner Abbott (1814–1891), born in Chelmsford, politician
 Keith Aucoin (born 1978), former NHL player
 Jeff Bauman (born 1986), author and Boston Marathon bombing survivor
 Phil Bourque (born 1962), former NHL player
 Gerry Callahan, sports columnist and radio host
 Dawn Clements (1958–2018), artist
 George Condo (born 1957), painter
 Bill Cooke (born 1951), former NFL player
 Dan Curran (born 1976), former NFL player
 Edward DeSaulnier (1921–1989), state legislator and judge
 Gururaj Deshpande, venture capitalist and entrepreneur
 Jack Eichel (born 1996), NHL player
 Steve Hunt (born 1958), jazz pianist and composer
 Ulysses John "Tony" Lupien (1917–2004), Major League Baseball player and college baseball coach
 Jon Morris (born 1966), former NHL player
 Colleen Mullen (born 1980), college basketball coach and former player
 Sandra Newman (born 1965), writer
 Benjamin Pierce (1757–1839), born in Chelmsford, Governor of New Hampshire and the father of U.S. president Franklin Pierce
 Jeffrey Snover, Microsoft Technical Fellow and inventor of PowerShell
 Peter Torkildsen (born 1958), former chairman of the Massachusetts Republican Party and former congressman
 John Traphagan (born 1961), author and professor of religious studies and anthropology
 Kristen Wilson (born 1969), actress

See also

 Islamic Society of Greater Lowell

References

Further reading

1871 Atlas of Massachusetts. by Wall & Gray.  Map of Massachusetts. Map of Middlesex County.
History of Chelmsford, Massachusetts, by Wilson Waters, Henry Spaulding Perham, published 1917, 893 pages.Two versions of History of Chelmsford, Massachusetts are online:  Page images and HTML
 History of Middlesex County, Massachusetts,   Volume 1 (A-H),  Volume 2 (L-W) compiled by Samuel Adams Drake, published 1879–1880. 572 and 505 pages.  Chelmsford article by Frederick P. Hill in volume 1 page 367–380.

 Money Magazine – Top 100 Places to Live

External links

Town of Chelmsford official website

 
Towns in Middlesex County, Massachusetts
Towns in Massachusetts
Massachusetts populated places on the Merrimack River